Crush on Me is the debut studio album by American musician Sir Babygirl. It was released on February 15, 2019 through Father/Daughter Records.

Track listing

External links
 Crush on Me at Father/Daughter Records

References

2019 debut albums
Father/Daughter Records albums